Neobulgaria is a genus of fungi within the family Leotiaceae. The genus, circumscribed by the Austrian mycologist Franz Petrak in 1921, contains nine species.

References

Helotiales genera
Helotiales
Taxa described in 1921
Taxa named by Franz Petrak